Two car bombings occurred in Aden, Yemen, in October 2021.

On 10 October 2021, a car bombing in Aden, Yemen, killed six people and wounded seven others. The state news agency said the bomb was a terrorist assassination attempt which targeted the Governor of Aden Ahmed Lamlas and agriculture minister Salem al-Suqatri.

On 30 October 2021, a car bombing near Aden International Airport killed at least 12 civilians and injured several others. Prime Minister Mueeen Abdulmalek Saeed described it as a terrorist bombing.

See also
2015 Aden car bombing
2016 Aden car bombing
2020 Aden airport attack

References

2020s crimes in Yemen
2021 bombings
21st-century mass murder in Yemen